Dipchasphecia kopica is a moth of the family Sesiidae. It is found in north-eastern Turkey.

The larvae feed on the roots of Acantholimon species.

References

Moths described in 2001
Sesiidae
Endemic fauna of Turkey